These are the American television shows that premiered in 2021.

Shows

Television films and specials
These television films and specials premiered or are scheduled to premiere in 2021. The premiere dates may be changed depending on a variety of factors.

Miniseries

References

2021 in American television
2021-related lists
Mass media timelines by year